Regio corazón, alma mexicana is a studio album by Myriam, issued nearly three years after her previous album. Myriam was the winner of the first season of the Mexican talent show La Academia.

It was released on January 25, 2011, and in digital form on February 1, 2011.

Track listing

References

2011 albums
Myriam Montemayor Cruz albums